The 1906 University of New Mexico football team was an American football team represented the University of New Mexico as an independent during the 1906 college football season. In its second season under head coach Martin F. Angell, the team compiled a 3–1 record and outscored opponents by a total of 59 to 30. Bernard H. Crawford was the team captain.

Schedule

References

University of New Mexico
New Mexico Lobos football seasons
University of New Mexico football